The Black Forest is a large forested mountain range in Baden-Württemberg, Germany.

Black Forest may also refer to:

Places

United States 
 Black Forest, Colorado, a census-designated place
 Black Forest, Nevada, a ghost town
 Black Forest Trail, Pennsylvania

Elsewhere 
 Black Forest, South Australia, a suburb of Adelaide, Australia
 Forêt Noire, a hamlet in the commune of La Foa, New Caledonia

Food
 Black Forest, a brand of gummy snacks owned by the Ferrara Pan Candy Company
 Black Forest gateau or Black Forest cake, a German dessert pastry
 Black Forest ham, a variety of smoked ham

Films
 Black Forest (2010 film), a German film 
 Black Forest (2012 film) (Floresta Negra), a fantasy, horror, sci fi film starring Tinsel Korey
 Black Forest (2013 film), a 2013 Indian Malayalam-language film
 Black Forest (2018 film) (Forêt Noire), a 2018 short film directed by Philippe David Gagné and Jean-Marc E. Roy
 The Black Forest (2019 film), a 2019 film by Ruth Platt

Music
 Black Forest Bluegrass, a 1979 album by P.D.Q. Bach (Peter Schickele)
 "The Black Forest", an instrumental song by Steve Vai from the album Alive in an Ultra World
 Black Forest (album), a 2008 album by Max Mutzke
Black Forrest, an album by jazz saxophonist Jimmy Forrest
Black Forest (band), a melodic death metal band.

Other uses
 The Black Forest (comics), a graphic novel series from Image Comics written by Todd Livingston and Robert Tinnell
 "The Black Forest", episode 10 in season 4 of the television series Six Feet Under 
 Black Forest Academy, a school in Kandern, Baden-Württemberg, Germany
 Black Forest Horse, an equine breed
 Black Forest Observatory, a geophysical observatory in Baden-Württemberg, Germany
 Black Forest Open, a tennis tournament held in Freudenstadt, Baden-Württemberg, Germany
 Black Forest Games. a video game developer in Offenburg, Germany
 Foret Noire, a character in the manga series Magical Trans!

See also
 A Walk in the Black Forest
 Schwarzwald (disambiguation)